Lorenzo Manta (born 16 September 1974 in Winterthur) is a former tennis player from Switzerland, who turned professional in 1992. The right-hander reached his highest ATP singles ranking of World No. 103 in June 2000. His best achievement in the grand slam tournaments was reaching the fourth round at Wimbledon in 1999. There, he had a big upset win over the 1996 Wimbledon champion, Richard Krajicek, in the third round in five sets. Manta was then defeated by Brazil's Gustavo Kuerten in the fourth round. He was 4–0 in Davis Cup doubles matches with Roger Federer.

Both his father Leonardo and his sister Joana also played tennis professionally.

Career finals

Doubles (1 loss)

External links

References

1974 births
Living people
Swiss male tennis players
People from Winterthur
Sportspeople from the canton of Zürich